Lincoln Wolfenstein (February 10, 1923, Cleveland, Ohio – March 27, 2015, Oakland, California) was an American particle physicist who studied the weak interaction.  Wolfenstein was born in 1923 and obtained his PhD in 1949 from the University of Chicago. He retired from Carnegie Mellon University in 2000 after being a faculty member for 52 years. Despite being retired, he continued to come into work nearly every day.

Wolfenstein was a particle phenomenologist, a theorist who focused primarily on connecting theoretical physics to experimental observations.  In 1978, he noted that the presence of electrons in Earth and Solar matter could affect neutrino propagation.  This work led to an eventual understanding of the MSW effect, which acts to enhance neutrino oscillation in matter. Wolfenstein received the 2005 Bruno Pontecorvo Prize from The Scientific Council of the Joint Institute for Nuclear Research (JINR), for his pioneering work on the MSW effect.

He was elected to the National Academy of Sciences in 1978. He was a founding member of the original Pittsburgh SANE (Committee for a Sane Nuclear Policy) and a member of the Union of Concerned Scientists. In 1986, Wolfenstein was awarded the New Person Award by the Thomas Merton Center in Pittsburgh for his work in pursuit of nuclear disarmament: He led a lifetime of advocating for responsible science as well as for individual rights and liberties.
In 1992, Wolfenstein was awarded the American Physical Society's J.J. Sakurai Prize for Theoretical Particle Physics for "his many contributions to the theory of weak interactions, particularly CP violation and the properties of neutrinos".

See also
Cabibbo–Kobayashi–Maskawa matrix (Wolfenstein parameters)
Carnegie Mellon University
MSW effect (Mikheyev–Smirnov–Wolfenstein effect)
Trimaximal mixing

References

External links
Lincoln Wolfenstein's profile at Carnegie Mellon University
Oral history interview, conducted 19 April 1997 by the American Institute of Physics
Barry R. Holstein, "Lincoln Wolfenstein", Biographical Memoirs of the National Academy of Sciences (2016)

1923 births
2015 deaths
American physicists
Particle physicists
Carnegie Mellon University faculty
Members of the United States National Academy of Sciences
J. J. Sakurai Prize for Theoretical Particle Physics recipients
Fellows of the American Physical Society
University of Chicago alumni